Kostyantyn "Kostya" Rurak (born on 9 April 1974 in Chelyabinsk, in the Russian SFSR of the Soviet Union) is a retired sprinter from Ukraine, who twice competed at the Summer Olympics: 1996 and 2000. He set his personal best in the men's 100 metres (10.17) on 3 August 2000 in Kyiv.

References

1974 births
Living people
Sportspeople from Chelyabinsk
Ukrainian male sprinters
Athletes (track and field) at the 1996 Summer Olympics
Athletes (track and field) at the 2000 Summer Olympics
Olympic athletes of Ukraine
European Athletics Championships medalists